Hunter Pollack (born August 6, 1997) is an American school safety activist and political advisor whose younger sister, Meadow, was murdered in the Stoneman Douglas High School shooting in 2018. He is the son of Shara Kaplan and Andrew Pollack, and is a part of the nonprofit organization Americans for Children's Lives and School Safety. Hunter is Jewish.

Activism and politics 
Hunter was invited to a White House listening session a week after the Stoneman Douglas shooting that was hosted by President Donald Trump, where his father expressed the need for increased safety measures in schools rather than focusing on gun control. Pollack was said to influence the passing of the Marjory Stoneman Douglas Safety Act (Florida Senate Bill: 7026), has met personally with President Trump and Vice President Pence, and  Governor Rick Scott.

Along with his father, Hunter served as an adviser on Florida Governor Ron DeSantis' Transition Advisory Committee on Public Safety.

March for Our Lives event controversy 

Pollack said he was prevented from reading a speech at the March for Our Lives event after being misled by event officials. David Hogg tweeted a video of Hunter reading his speech at the Ride for Meadow event, and blamed the omission on a logistical issue. Ryan Deitsch denied any political reason for the omission and stated that Hunter decided not to attend the march, which Hunter disputes. Key organizers in the march were criticized for not including other points of view.

References 

1997 births
Living people
Stoneman Douglas High School shooting activists
People from Florida
American Jews
Jewish activists
American gun rights activists
Gun politics in the United States
People from Long Island
American people of Polish-Jewish descent
American people of Russian-Jewish descent